Caleb Holley (born December 26, 1990) is a Canadian football wide receiver for the Vegas Knight Hawks of the Indoor Football League (IFL). He has also been a member of the Buffalo Bills (NFL), Los Angeles Kiss (AFL), Sioux Falls Storm (IFL), Saskatchewan Roughriders (CFL), Ottawa Redblacks (CFL), and Edmonton Elks (CFL). A native of Anchorage, Alaska, Holley played college football for the East Central Tigers in the Great American Conference (GAC).

Professional career

Early career
Holley was signed by the Buffalo Bills in 2014 as an undrafted free agent. He didn't catch on despite two training camps with the team. Holley spent the first part of 2016 with the Sioux Falls Storm of the Indoor Football League. Holley played 11 games in the mid-western indoor league, catching 40 passes for 650 yards and 21 touchdowns. Holley also returned kicks for a total of 168 yards. Holley was named IFL Offensive Player-of-the-Week for Week 9, and by the end of the season, the Storm won the United Bowl championship.

Saskatchewan Roughriders 
In August 2016, Holley signed with the Saskatchewan Roughriders of the Canadian Football League (CFL). During the two years of the rookie contract, Holley surpassed 600 yards each season, and partway through 2017 he was signed to a one-year extension. The Roughriders paid Holley an immediate $20,000 CDN bonus, and the contract was reportedly worth $104,500 CDN for the 2018 CFL season, provided Holley played every game and met performance benchmarks. However, Holley played only 9 games in 2018, and had a career low in catches and yards with just 14 receptions for 213 yards. In addition, Holley did not have a touchdown catch in 2018, and for the second year in a row, Holley missed the Roughriders' playoff games. Following the season Holley and the Riders did not come to an agreement on a new contract, and Holley became a free agent on February 12, 2019.

Ottawa Redblacks 
On February 14, 2019, Holley signed a one-year contract with the Ottawa Redblacks. The 2019 difficult for the Redblacks, finishing with a league-worst 3–15 record. The offense struggled all season after  and offensive coordinator Jaime Elizondo's resigned shortly before the start of the season to pursue job in the XFL. Holley's status as a deep threat was not utilized, with the patchwork offensive committee calling up bubble screen for Holley instead. Nevertheless, Holley saw more playing time in Ottawa than he did while with the Riders catching 48 passes for 487 yards. He became a free agent upon the expiry of his contract on February 11, 2020.

BC Lions 
On February 21, 2020, Holley signed with the BC Lions. However, the 2020 CFL season was cancelled and he became a free agent again on February 9, 2021.

Edmonton Elks
On January 26, 2022, Holley signed with the Edmonton Elks of the Canadian Football League (CFL). On July 29, 2022, Holley was released by the Elks.

Vegas Knight Hawks
On September 1, 2022, Holley signed with the Vegas Knight Hawks of the Indoor Football League (IFL).

Statistics

References

External links
NFL.com Profile
ECU Tigers bio
Career transactions

Living people
1990 births
Players of American football from Anchorage, Alaska
American football wide receivers
African-American players of American football
City College of San Francisco Rams football players
East Central Tigers football players
Los Angeles Kiss players
Sioux Falls Storm players
Saskatchewan Roughriders players
Canadian football wide receivers
American players of Canadian football
Ottawa Redblacks players